"9,999,999 Tears" is a 1976 hit single by Dickey Lee.  The song was written and originally recorded by American country music artist Razzy Bailey.  Originally entitled "9,999,999 Years", it was released as a non-album single in 1966 but did not reach the charts.

Dickey Lee cover
Dickey Lee covered "9,999,999 Tears" in 1976. Released in November, it was the third and final single from his album Angels, Roses and Rain. The song peaked at number 3 on the U.S. Billboard Hot Country Singles and Canadian RPM Country Tracks charts. It also reached the pop charts of both nations.

The song about crying marked a return to the pop charts for Lee following a 10-year hiatus. In the interim he had begun a 10-year string of country hits ending in 1981. "9,999,999 Tears" is among his greatest hits and his only hit to have charted on both the pop and country charts.

Chart performance

References

External links
 
 

1966 songs
1966 singles
1976 singles
RCA Records singles
Razzy Bailey songs
Dickey Lee songs